The Indiana National Guard (INNG) is a component of the United States Armed Forces, the United States National Guard and the Military Department of Indiana (MDI). It consists of the Indiana Army National Guard, the Indiana Air National Guard, and the Adjutant General's Office.

Indiana National Guard units are trained and equipped as part of the United States Army and Air Force. The same ranks and insignia are used, and National Guardsmen are eligible to receive all United States military awards. The INNG also awards a number of state awards for local services rendered in or to the state of Indiana.

The Indiana National Guard consists of 14,000 soldiers and airmen, and maintains Army National Guard armories across the state, training facilities at Camp Atterbury-Muscatatuck, and Air National Guard wings at Fort Wayne and Terre Haute. During peacetime, the National Guard is commanded by the governor. In its state role, the National Guard assists local law enforcement agencies during emergencies at the direction of the governor. The distribution of soldiers, equipment and facilities across the state allows the National Guard to respond quickly and efficiently to emergencies statewide.

During times of national emergency, National Guard members may be called into active federal service by the president of the United States. The National Guard's dual federal-state mission is unique to the U.S. military and sets the National Guard apart from any other reserve component.

The Indiana National Guard is supported by the state's military defense force, the Indiana Guard Reserve, a supplemental military force authorized by both the State Code of Indiana and Executive Order. The IGR assumes the state mission of the Indiana National Guard in the event the Guard is federally mobilized.

Indiana Army National Guard

38th Infantry Division ("Cyclone")

 Headquarters and Headquarters Company
 38th Infantry Division Band

38th Sustainment Brigade ("Avengers")
 Headquarters and Headquarters Company
 38th Special Troops Battalion
 190th Motor Transportation Battalion
 519th Combat Sustainment Support Battalion

38th Combat Aviation Brigade ("Falcons")
 Headquarters and Headquarters Company
 2nd Battalion, 238th General Support Aviation Battalion
 1st Battalion, 137th Aviation Regiment
 DET 1, Company C, 1st Battalion, 136th Aviation Regiment
 638th Aviation Support Battalion

76th Infantry Brigade Combat Team ("Nighthawk Brigade")
 1st Battalion, 151st Infantry Regiment
 2nd Battalion, 151st Infantry Regiment
 2nd Battalion, 152nd Infantry Regiment
 1st Battalion, 293rd Infantry Regiment
 1st Squadron, 152nd Cavalry Regiment
 1st Battalion, 163rd Field Artillery Regiment
 113th Brigade Support Battalion
 776th Brigade Engineer Battalion

54th Security Force Assistance Brigade ("To the Very End")

219th Engineer Brigade ("Steel Soldiers - Anytime, Anywhere")

 Headquarters and Headquarters Company
 113th Engineer Battalion
 2nd Battalion, 150th Field Artillery Regiment
 738th Signal Company

81st Troop Command ("War Eagles")
 A Company, 2-20 Special Forces
 19th CBRNE Enhanced Response Force Package Battalion
 81st Military Police Battalion
 127th Cyber Protection Battalion
 53rd Civil Support Team
 120th Public Affairs Detachment
 135th Chaplain Detachment
 138th Military History Detachment
 1938th Acquisition Team
 1976th Acquisition Team

138th Regiment - Combat Arms ("Seek and Destroy")
 Headquarters, 138th Regiment (Combat Arms) Indiana Regional Training Institute

Indiana Air National Guard

Indiana Air National Guard Headquarters
 Headquarters and Headquarters Company

122nd Fighter Wing ("Blacksnakes")

 122nd Operations Group
 163rd Fighter Squadron
 122nd Maintenance Group
 122nd Mission Support Group
 122nd Medical Group

181st Intelligence Wing ("Racers")

 181st Mission Support Group
 181st Intelligence Group
 181st Medical Group
 113th Air Support Operations Squadron

History

Revolutionary War
The Indiana National Guard's roots began in pre-Independence North America. Around the time of the Beaver Wars, French colonists established trading posts and villages, forming militias for their defense.  When the American Revolutionary War began, many militias in modern-day Indiana, Illinois and Kentucky declared for the United States against the British. To express his support, militia Captain François Riday Busseron commissioned the first American flag of Indiana in 1778.  Militias in southern-Indiana, aided by George Rogers Clark and Piankeshaw natives, captured Fort Sackville in February 1779, an important British fort in the Ohio River Valley.

Indiana Territory
After the American victory in the Revolutionary War, on 25 July 1788 Governor Arthur St. Clair, the first governor of the newly purchased Northwest Territory, published a law organizing the territory's militias into an official armed force of the United States. The Northwest Territory proved difficult to subdue, however, as the local Miami and Shawnee tribes resisted the United States. This resistance escalated to begin the Northwest Indian War, as many American generals, still fresh from their victory over the British, took it upon themselves to defeat any resistance to the rapidly expanding United States. The War began horribly for the United States, and in quick succession the United States suffered two horrendous defeats in the 1790 Harmar campaign and the 1791 St. Clair's defeat - still to this day the most decisive defeat in the history of the American military.

After the failures of Harmar and St. Clair, General Anthony Wayne reorganized and expanded the Continental Army, calling his force the Legion of the United States. Wayne marched his army into the Northwest Territory, where he broke America's string of bad luck with his decisive victory at the 1794 Battle of Fallen Timbers. After his victory, he marched into Indiana and founded Fort Wayne, Indiana.

The Northwest Territory was broken up upon Ohio's admittance into the Union, and was renamed the Indiana Territory in 1800. The Indiana National Guard traces its unbroken history to 1801, when Indiana's first governor, William Henry Harrison, formed the Indiana Legion to defend settlers against the aggressive actions of the Native American tribes in the territory. Years later, in 1807, Harrison founded the Indiana Rangers, modeling them after General Wayne's mounted troops used at the Battle of Fallen Timbers.  The Indiana Legion was charged with the defense of all settlements in the Territory, while the Rangers were tasked with safeguarding the Buffalo Trace, the main transportation route between Louisville, Kentucky and Vincennes.

This era in Indiana history was particularly hazardous, as the Shawnee leader Tecumseh sought to unify the tribes of the Indiana Territory and drive the Americans out. Tensions climaxed when Harrison led the Indiana Legion, 1000 strong, to attack Tecumseh's capital of Prophetstown. Outside of Prophetstown, the Legion was ambushed early in the morning of November 7, 1811. The Legion and Rangers held their ground for two hours, defeating the ambush and burning Prophetstown to the ground. Over the next two years, simultaneously with the War of 1812, Harrison and the Indiana Legion continued to battle against Tecumeh's confederacy, chasing him into Canada and taking part in Tecumseh's final defeat at the 1813 Battle of the Thames. The Legion continued to fight the British in Canada until the cessation of the war in 1815.

Tragically, between the movement of Indiana's capital from Vincennes to Corydon, Indiana, and then again to Indianapolis, most documents regarding the Indiana Legion have been lost. In one unfortunate incident, a janitor sold a wagon load of official Legion papers as "waste paper."

Mexican-American War
Indiana units were first officially called to federal service in 1846, taking part in the Mexican–American War. General Joseph Lane's Indiana Brigade played a critical role on American army's left flank in the Battle of Buena Vista, a critical battle that routed the Mexican Army and open the way for Mexico's rapid occupation.

American Civil War
Indiana answered Abraham Lincoln's call to federal service against the Confederacy. Indiana's governor, Oliver P. Morton, is famously remembered as one of Lincoln's "war governors," and stalwartly pledged Indiana's support for the Union. Indiana committed over 200,000 soldiers throughout the war, with Indiana units serving in some of the most famous units of the Union Army, including the Iron Brigade, the Lightning Brigade, and Colonel Eli Lilly's 18th Indiana Battery of Light Artillery. Indiana units on average suffered approximately 35% casualties throughout the war. With so many Hoosiers serving in the Union Army, the Indiana Legion was reactivated to guard the home front, taking part in the Battle of Corydon. After the war, the Indiana Legion was renamed the Indiana National Guard in 1895.

Twentieth century
The Indiana National Guard took part in its first overseas operations in the Spanish–American War, taking part in the occupation of the Philippines. After the war, the Militia Act of 1903 organized the various state militias into the present National Guard system, making state forces easier to federalize and improving the quality of professionalism and training. Fort Benjamin Harrison was established north of Indianapolis in 1906 as both a Regular Army post and the headquarters of the Indiana Army National Guard.
In 1916, the Indiana guard was mobilized to patrol the Mexican border as part of the Mexican Border War. The next year in 1917, Indiana Guardsmen were mobilized as the United States joined World War I. It was in this year that the modern organization of the Indiana National Guard took form, with the creation of the 38th Infantry Division at Camp Shelby, MS and the 113th Aero Squadron, the predecessor of the 181st Intelligence Wing. The 150th Field Artillery Regiment, the successors of Eli Lilly's 18th Battery of Light Artillery, saw extensive action in 1918 under the command of Indiana legend Robert Tyndall, who would later serve as commander of the 38th Infantry Division, mayor of Indianapolis, and would be vital to the founding of the American Legion.

After World War I, amendments were made to the National Defense Act of 1916 which codified the National Guard as a permanent part of the United States Army. The final amendment in 1921 allowed the National Guard to "preserve the names, numbers and other designations, flags and records of the division that served in the World War." Stout Army Airfield was established in 1926, serving as the headquarters for the Indiana Guard's Army Air Corps.

When America joined World War II, the Indiana Guard was once again federalized. Camp Atterbury was established in 1942, training hundreds of thousands of Soldiers until the war's conclusion. The 38th Infantry Division was activated at Camp Shelby, MS, and would serve in the Pacific from 1944-1945, earning the nickname "Avengers of Bataan."

After World War II, the Army debated the necessity of a separate National Guard at all, deciding finally in 1947 to maintain the unique dual-status purpose of the National Guard. From 1947, the Indiana National Guard has had an unbroken federally-recognized status. Indiana Guard units served in the Korean War, and famously had the only National Guard combat arms unit that saw combat during the Vietnam War - Company D (Ranger), 151st Infantry Regiment, gaining the moniker "The Indiana Rangers." Company D is recognized as the spiritual successors to the Indiana Rangers established prior to Indiana's statehood. During their one-year deployment to Vietnam, "Delta Company" was awarded 510 medals for valor and service, making it one of the most decorated units in United States Army history.

After the Vietnam War, Chief of Staff Creighton Abrams saw the negative effects of President Lyndon B. Johnson's decision to use the draft rather than activate the National Guard and Reserve. In response, he made it the policy of the United States Army that going forward, the U.S. will never again go to war without calling up the Guard.

With the revitalization of the National Guard, the Indiana National Guard was federally activated in much larger numbers in the last years of the 20th century. Taking on their full duty as a dual-purpose force, the Indiana National Guard served in response to hurricanes, natural disasters, and were activated to serve in the 1991 Gulf War and the U.S. intervention during the Bosnian War and the Kosovo War.

Twenty-first century
Following the September 11 attacks, the Indiana Guard was further expanded and had a significant part in the Iraq and Afghanistan Wars, serving in Operation Iraqi Freedom, Operation Enduring Freedom, and Operation Spartan Shield. Indiana Guard units were present during the 2004 elections in Afghanistan and the 2005 elections in Iraq. As of 2020, 133 Indiana Guardsmen had been killed in action in Iraq and Afghanistan. As recently as 2022, Indiana Guard units are present in Kuwait and Kosovo.

See also

Indiana Air National Guard
Indiana Guard Reserve
Indiana Naval Militia

References

Sources
National Guard of the United States, accessed 4 November 2006
Indiana National Guard, accessed 20 November 2006
GlobalSecurity.org Indiana Army National Guard, accessed 20 November 2006

Notes

External links
Bibliography of Indiana Army National Guard History compiled by the United States Army Center of Military History
Indiana National Guard Homepage

United States Army National Guard by state
Military in Indiana
United States Air National Guard